Major General Sir David Mercer,  (1 July 1864 – 1 July 1920) was a Royal Marines officer who served as Adjutant-General Royal Marines.

Military career
Mercer was commissioned into the Royal Marine Light Infantry in 1883. 

He became commander of the 1st (Royal Naval) Brigade in 1914 and saw action during the Siege of Antwerp. Following the subsequent retreat, Mercer led the brigade into the Netherlands to avoid capture by the Germans. In 1915, still at the head of the brigade, he took part in the Gallipoli landings in June 1915. The plan had been for Mercer to become military governor of Imbros but, after fierce fighting, he was evacuated from Gallipoli in December 1915. 

He went on to be Assistant Adjutant-General in September 1911 and Adjutant-General Royal Marines in June 1916.

Personal life
Mercer married Katherine F. Laurence, who survived him. He died on his 56th birthday of heart failure following an operation. He was buried in Hamilton Road Cemetery, Deal.

References

Sources

 

1864 births
1920 deaths
Knights Commander of the Order of the Bath
Royal Marines generals
Royal Marines generals of World War I
People from Islington (district)
Military personnel from Middlesex
Gallipoli campaign
Burials in Kent